Daniel Marco (born 31 January 1966) is a former professional tennis player from Spain.

Biography
Marco grew up in the Moroccan city of Tangier, where he was born in 1966. The son of a competitive swimmer, Marco moved to Marbella in 1986 and was based there during his career.

His only ATP Tour main draw appearance came at the 1992 South African Open in Johannesburg. He beat Lars Jonsson in the first round, then lost in the round of 16 to Chris Pridham, in a third set tiebreak.

At Challenger level he won a title in Bogota in 1992 and the same year had a win over Pat Rafter at the Sevilla Challenger.

Challenger titles

Singles: (1)

References

External links
 
 

1966 births
Living people
Spanish male tennis players
People from Tangier